PRGS may refer to:

 Frederick S. Pardee RAND Graduate School, an American higher education institution
 Progress Software Corporation, an American software company with Nasdaq index PRGS
 Phosphoribosylglycinamide formyltransferase, an enzyme
 Pokémon Ranger: Guardian Signs, a video game in the Pokémon series

See also 
PRG (disambiguation)